Glutamate [NMDA] receptor subunit 3A is a protein that in humans is encoded by the GRIN3A gene.

Function 

This gene encodes a subunit of the N-methyl-D-aspartate (NMDAR) receptors, which belong to the superfamily of glutamate-regulated ion channels, and function in physiological and pathological processes in the central nervous system. This subunit shows greater than 90% identity to the corresponding subunit in rat. Studies in the knockout mouse deficient in this subunit suggest that this gene may be involved in the development of synaptic elements by modulating NMDA receptor activity.

See also
 NMDA receptor

References

Further reading

External links 
 

Ionotropic glutamate receptors